Aku Ingin Menciummu Sekali Saja is a 2002 Indonesian crime drama film directed by Garin Nugroho.

Cast 
 Octavianus Rysiat Muabuay as Arnold
 Lulu Tobing as Kasih / The Crying Woman
 Minus Coneston Karoba as Minus
 Adi Kurdi as Pastur / Father
 Philipus Ramendei Thamo as Berthold
 Vivaldi Gorys Aronggear as Dickson
 Theys H. Eluay as himself
 Sylvia Roselani Samber as Mamma

External links 
 

2002 films
2000s Indonesian-language films
2002 crime drama films
Films directed by Garin Nugroho
Films shot in Indonesia
Indonesian drama films